Rafael Iriondo Aurtenetxea (24 October 1918 – 24 February 2016) was a Spanish football forward and manager.

He amassed La Liga totals of 285 matches and 89 goals over 15 seasons, with Athletic Bilbao and Real Sociedad. He subsequently became a manager, working for nearly 30 years and being in charge of both clubs.

Club career
Born in Guernica, Biscay, Iriondo arrived at Basque giants Athletic Bilbao in 1940, from Atlético Tetuán. He made his La Liga debut on 29 September in a 2–2 draw at Valencia CF and, during his 13-year spell with the club, would form an historic attacking partnership with Agustín Gaínza, José Luis Panizo and Telmo Zarra, helping Athletic to the 1942–43 league and four Copa del Generalísimo trophies.

After 328 official games for Athletic with 115 goals, Iriondo moved to another team in the region, Barakaldo CF, in 1953. After a couple of months, however, he returned to the top division and joined Real Sociedad, retiring shortly after the end of the 1954–55 season.

Iriondo started coaching immediately after retiring, with modest SD Indautxu in the Segunda División. He continued in his native region the following years, with Deportivo Alavés and Barakaldo.

In the 1968–69 campaign, Iriondo returned to Athletic Bilbao as head coach, helping the club to the 11th place in the league and the domestic cup. He would also manage the team for two full seasons in the mid-1970s, interspersed with stints at RCD Español, Real Zaragoza and Real Sociedad.

Iriondo's last coaching job was with Real Betis: he led the Andalusians to the 1977 Spanish Cup, but suffered top-flight relegation the following season. After 15 matches at Rayo Vallecano in 1980 (meeting the same fate) he returned to Betis for one final campaign in 1981–82, being one of three managers to help the team finish sixth in the top tier and qualify for the UEFA Cup for the first time ever; he died in Bilbao on 24 February 2016, aged 97.

International career
Iriondo earned two caps for Spain in as many friendlies, his debut coming on 23 June 1946 in a 0–1 loss to the Republic of Ireland in Madrid. This was the first national team game attended by general Francisco Franco.

Seven months later, in Lisbon, he scored against Portugal who won 4–1.

Honours

Player
Athletic Bilbao
La Liga: 1942–43
Copa del Generalísimo: 1943, 1944, 1945, 1950
Copa Eva Duarte: 1950

Manager
Athletic Bilbao
Copa del Generalísimo: 1969

Betis
Copa del Rey: 1976–77

References

External links

Athletic Bilbao manager profile

1918 births
2016 deaths
People from Guernica
Sportspeople from Biscay
Spanish footballers
Footballers from the Basque Country (autonomous community)
Association football forwards
La Liga players
Segunda División players
Gernika Club footballers
Atlético Tetuán footballers
Athletic Bilbao footballers
Barakaldo CF footballers
Real Sociedad footballers
SD Indautxu footballers
Spain international footballers
Spanish football managers
La Liga managers
Segunda División managers
Deportivo Alavés managers
Barakaldo CF managers
Athletic Bilbao B managers
Athletic Bilbao managers
RCD Espanyol managers
Real Zaragoza managers
Real Sociedad managers
Real Betis managers
Rayo Vallecano managers